Maslovsky (masculine), Maslovskaya (feminine), or Maslovskoye (neuter) is the name of several rural localities in Russia.

Modern localities
Maslovsky (rural locality), a settlement in Gololobovskoye Rural Settlement of Zaraysky District in Moscow Oblast; 
Maslovskoye, Nizhny Novgorod Oblast, a settlement in Natalyinsky Selsoviet under the administrative jurisdiction of the town of oblast significance of Navashino in Nizhny Novgorod Oblast; 
Maslovskoye, Novgorod Oblast, a selo in Poddorskoye Settlement of Poddorsky District in Novgorod Oblast
Maslovskaya, Vilegodsky District, Arkhangelsk Oblast, a village in Nikolsky Selsoviet of Vilegodsky District in Arkhangelsk Oblast; 
Maslovskaya, Vinogradovsky District, Arkhangelsk Oblast, a village in Zaostrovsky Selsoviet of Vinogradovsky District in Arkhangelsk Oblast; 
Maslovskaya, Vologda Oblast, a village in Razinsky Selsoviet of Kharovsky District in Vologda Oblast

Alternative names
Maslovsky, alternative name of Novaya Maslovka, a selo in Chernyansky District of Belgorod Oblast; 
Maslovsky, alternative name of Maslovka, a selo in Prokhorovsky District of Belgorod Oblast; 
Maslovsky, alternative name of Maslovo, a settlement in Kochenyovsky District of Novosibirsk Oblast;